The 1995 BCR Open Romania was a men's tennis tournament held in Bucharest, Romania. The event was played on outdoor clay courts and was part of the ATP World Series of the 1995 ATP Tour. It was the third edition of the tournament and was held from 11 September through 18 September 1995. First-seeded Thomas Muster won the singles title.

Finals

Singles
 Thomas Muster defeated  Gilbert Schaller 6–3, 6–4
It was Muster's 11th singles title of the year and 34th of his career.

Doubles
 Mark Keil /  Jeff Tarango defeated  Cyril Suk /  Daniel Vacek 6–4, 7–6

References

External links
 ITF tournament edition details

BCR Open Romania
Romanian Open
R
Romanian Open